David Geffrey Lacy-Scott (18 August 1920 – 2 February 2020) was an English amateur cricketer.

Born at Calcutta in August 1920, Lacy-Scott was educated at Marlborough College and Peterhouse College, Cambridge University. He served in the British Indian Army during the Second World War, receiving an emergency commission in to the Royal Indian Army Service Corps on 27 October 1941. He relinquished his commission on account of ill-health, 22 December 1945, and was granted the honorary rank of captain.

Lacy-Scott made ten first-class cricket appearances for Cambridge University Cricket Club as an opening batsman, almost all of which came in the 1946 English cricket season. He won a Blue in 1946 but only played one first-class match for Cambridge after the season, appearing in 1948 against Free Foresters. He also made one appearance for Kent against Sussex in August 1946, having previously played in two Minor Counties Championship matches for Kent's Second XI in 1938 and 1939.

He latterly resided in rural Suffolk and died in February 2020 at the age of 99.

References

External links
Indian Army Officers 1939−1945

1920 births
2020 deaths
Military personnel of British India
British Indian Army officers
Indian Army personnel of World War II
English cricketers
Cambridge University cricketers
Kent cricketers
People educated at Marlborough College
Alumni of Peterhouse, Cambridge
Free Foresters cricketers